Chiu Ping-kun (born January 2, 1964) is a famous Taiwanese archer and coach. He obtained a Ph.D. from the University of Northern Colorado. He is also an international archery judge.
Chiu participated at the 1988 Summer Olympics. 
Prior to succeeding Kao Chun-hsiung as president of National Taiwan Sport University, Chiu led the NTSU Graduate Institute of Coaching Science. Chiu has also served as executive director of Taiwan's National Sports Training Center.

References

1964 births
Living people
Olympic archers of Taiwan
Asian Games medalists in archery
Archers at the 1990 Asian Games
Archers at the 1988 Summer Olympics
Taiwanese male archers
Asian Games bronze medalists for Chinese Taipei
Medalists at the 1990 Asian Games
Presidents of universities and colleges in Taiwan